Sedum litoreum is a species of annual herb in the family Crassulaceae. Individuals can grow to 3.7 cm.

Sources

References 

litoreum
Flora of Malta